The CONCACAF Gold Cup is North America's major tournament in senior men's football and determines the continental champion. Until 1989, the tournament was known as CONCACAF Championship. It is currently held every two years. From 1996 to 2005, nations from other confederations have regularly joined the tournament as invitees. In earlier editions, the continental championship was held in different countries, but since the inception of the Gold Cup in 1991, the United States are constant hosts or co-hosts.

From 1973 to 1989, the tournament doubled as the confederation's World Cup qualification. CONCACAF's representative team at the FIFA Confederations Cup was decided by a play-off between the winners of the last two tournament editions, in the CONCACAF Cup, for 2017.

Since the inaugural tournament in 1963, the Gold Cup was held 26 times and has been won by seven different nations, most often by Mexico (11 titles).

Although Jamaica was one of the nine teams which participated in the inaugural 1963 CONCACAF Championship, they failed to make an impact on continental level all the way through the 1980s. Since the inception of the Gold Cup, however, they have been regular guests in the knockout stage, culminating in playing two consecutive finals in 2015 and 2017. They lost the matches 1–3 to Mexico, and 1–2 to the United States.

Overall record

Match overview

Record players

Top goalscorers

Darren Mattocks is Jamaica's leading top scorer at continental championships, and scored in the 2015 final against Mexico.

References

Countries at the CONCACAF Gold Cup
Gold cup